Stuart Thom (born 27 December 1976) is an English former footballer who played in the Football League for Mansfield Town, Oldham Athletic and Scunthorpe United.

External links

1976 births
Living people
Association football defenders
Barrow A.F.C. players
English Football League players
English footballers
Footballers from Dewsbury
Mansfield Town F.C. players
Nottingham Forest F.C. players
Oldham Athletic A.F.C. players
Scunthorpe United F.C. players